The 2003 Copa América de Futsal was the 8th edition under FIFA rules, 19th edition of the main international futsal tournament of the South America region. It took place in Asunción, Paraguay from 26 August to 1 September 2003.

The tournament acted as a qualifying tournament for the 2004 FIFA Futsal World Championship in Taiwan.

Championship
The ten participating teams are divided into three groups of three in the first two groups and four teams in the last group, which will play each in a single round-robin format. The top team of each group advances to the semi-finals with the second placed team from Group C. The top three teams for the tournament will earn participation at the 2004 Futsal World Championship.

Group A

Group B

Group C

Final round

Final classification

References
 Copa América de Futsal 2003 todos los daos en RSSSF
 Copa América de Futsal Paraguay 2003

Copa América de Futsal
International futsal competitions hosted by Paraguay
Copa América de Futsal, 2003
2003 in Paraguayan football